Five Ways Tower is a 23-storey commercial building, completed in 1979, on a  prime site located in the Birmingham City Centre by the corner of Frederick Road and Islington Road, near to the Five Ways roundabout and close to Five Ways Station, at the gateway to the Edgbaston area of Birmingham 15, England.

Several hotels expressed interest in acquiring the building from its owners, since its solid concrete design could be converted into a business class hotel.

The building is vacant due to the last tenants evacuating the building in 2005 due to ill health amongst the workforce. It was discovered that the building suffers from sick building syndrome, and being too expensive to refurbish to modern standards a likely option is demolition in line with the regeneration of the surrounding area.

The building has a carpark for approximately 200 cars allocated to the Tower.

The building's architect was Philip Bright of the Property Services Agency. Andy Foster described it as being similar to the work of James Stirling.

See also
 List of tallest buildings and structures in Birmingham

References

External links
Emporis entry
Skyscrapernews entry

1979 establishments in England
Skyscrapers in Birmingham, West Midlands
Skyscraper office buildings in England
Unused buildings in the United Kingdom
Commercial buildings completed in 1979